Baleyn may refer to:
 Baleyn, Ilam
 Baleyn, Eyvan, Ilam Province
 Baleyn, Lorestan